Kenilworth is a town in Warwickshire, England.

Kenilworth may also refer to:

Places

Australia
 Kenilworth, Queensland

Canada
 Kenilworth, Edmonton, a neighbourhood
 Kenilworth, Ontario, a town in Wellington County

Ireland
 Kenilworth Square, a Victorian garden square in Dublin

South Africa
 Kenilworth, Cape Town
 Kenilworth, Gauteng

United States
 Kenilworth, Illinois 
 Kenilworth (Metra station), a commuter railroad station
 Kenilworth, New Jersey
 Kenilworth, Pennsylvania
 Kenilworth Trail, a shared-use path in Minneapolis
 Kenilworth, Utah
 Kenilworth, Washington, D.C.

Other uses
 Kenilworth (novel), written in 1821 by Sir Walter Scott
 Kenilworth (TV series), based on the Sir Walter Scott novel, that aired on BBC
 Kenilworth Castle, a structure around which Kenilworth (Warwickshire, England) was founded
 Kenilworth Park Racetrack, a venue in Windsor, Ontario, Canada
 Kenilworth, Potts Point, a historic house in a suburb of Sydney, Australia 
 The Kenilworth, an apartment building in New York City, New York, United States

See also
 The Masque at Kenilworth, a cantata by Henry Fothergill Chorley and Arthur Sullivan
 Killingworth, Connecticut, a town in the United States that is named after Kenilworth, Warwickshire, England
 Creston-Kenilworth, Portland, Oregon, a neighborhood in Portland, Oregon, United States